The Belgian Sportsman of the Year is elected at the end of each year by professional sportjournalists and former winners, annually since 1967. A Belgian Sportswoman of the Year title has been given out since 1975. Top winners include Ingrid Berghmans (8 wins), Kim Clijsters (8) and Eddy Merckx (6).

More categories were added in 1997, with the Belgian Sportsteam of the Year, 1998 with the Belgian Talent of the Year, 2010 with the Belgian Paralympic Athlete of the Year and lastly in 2011 the Belgian Coach of the Year.

The youngest male winner of the Belgian sportsman of the year is Remco Evenepoel who won the award at the age of 19.
The youngest female winner is Carine Verbauwen, who won the award at the age of 13.

List of winners

Breakdown of winners by sport

Men

Women

Team

Talent

Paralympic

Coach

Overall

See also 
Belgian Sports Personality of the Year

References 

National sportsperson-of-the-year trophies and awards
Belgian sports trophies and awards
Awards established in 1967
1967 establishments in Belgium